All of the U.S. state of Alabama is in the Central Time Zone (UTC−06:00, DST UTC−05:00) and observes daylight saving time.

Unofficially, Phenix City in Russell County and an area surrounding it, Lanett and Valley in Chambers County and some towns in Lee County observe Eastern Time (UTC−05:00, DST UTC−04:00).

IANA time zone database
The IANA time zone database identifier for Alabama is America/Chicago.

References

Alabama
Geography of Alabama